Anopheles moucheti is a species of mosquito. It is an anthropophile. It can be mainly located in Congo Basin forest, Central Africa. It was the main vector of malaria.

References 

Insects described in 1923